Tim Barry is an American musician and the lead singer of the Richmond, Virginia-based punk rock band Avail.  In addition to performing with Avail, he was the bass guitarist in the Richmond-based folk punk band (Young) Pioneers from 1994 to 1995. Barry has been performing folk music on his own since 2004.

Discography

Albums 
 Rivanna Junction – 2006 – Chunksaah Records
 Manchester – 2008 – Chunksaah Records
 28th & Stonewall – 2010 – Chunksaah Records
 40 Miler – 2012 – Chunksaah Records
 Laurel Street Demo & Live at Munford Elementary – 2013 – Chunksaah Records
 Raising Hell & Living Cheap, Live in Richmond – 2014 Chunksaah Records
 Lost & Rootless – 2014 – Chunksaah Records
 High on 95 – 2017 – Chunksaah Records
The Roads to Richmond - 2019– Chunksaah Records
• Spring Hill – 2022- Chunksaah Records

Splits and Collaborations 
Frank Turner / Tim Barry – Split EP (October 13, 2009)

DVDs 
 Live (featuring Tim Barry and La Par Force) – 2006
 Live at the Grey Eagle – 2010

External links 
 Tim Barry's official page
 Chunksaah Records
 Suburban Home Records

Music of Richmond, Virginia
American punk rock singers
Living people
Place of birth missing (living people)
Musicians from Richmond, Virginia
(Young) Pioneers members
Year of birth missing (living people)